The U.S. House Committee on Homeland Security is a standing committee of the United States House of Representatives. Its responsibilities include U.S. security legislation and oversight of the Department of Homeland Security.

Role of the committee
The committee conducts oversight and handles legislation (and resolutions) related to the security of the United States. The committee may amend, approve, or table homeland security related bills. It also has the power to hold hearings, conduct investigations, and subpoena witnesses. Additionally, the committee has authorization and policy oversight responsibilities over the Department of Homeland Security.

Rules of the committee
The committee meets on the first Wednesday of each month while the House is in session. It is not permitted to conduct business unless a quorum is present, which the rules define as one third of its members. A majority of members are required for certain actions including: issuing a subpoena, entering executive session, and immunizing a witness. Committee members have access to classified information but must adhere to stringent access control procedures.

History of the committee
In the 109th Congress, the House Select Committee on Homeland Security was established on June 19, 2002, pursuant to H. Res. 449 (adopted by voice vote). The committee was composed of nine members of the House: Mr. Armey, chairman; Mr. DeLay; Mr. Watts of Oklahoma; Ms. Pryce of Ohio; Mr. Portman; Ms. Pelosi; Mr. Frost; Mr. Menendez; and Ms. DeLauro.

The mandate of the Select Committee in the 107th Congress was to “develop recommendations and report to the House on such matters that relate to the establishment of a department of homeland security.” The Select Committee accomplished its mandate on November 22, 2002, when the House concurred in the Senate amendment to H.R. 5005 by unanimous consent and cleared H.R. 5005 for the President. The bill was presented to the President on November 22, 2002, and was signed on November 25, 2002, becoming Public Law number 107-296, the "Homeland Security Act of 2002".

The termination date of the House Select Committee on Homeland Security was “after final disposition of a bill including the final disposition of any veto message on such bill,” which occurred on November 25, 2002.

The second select committee was formed in 2003 at the beginning of the 108th Congress as a select committee with Rep. Christopher Cox of California as its chairman and Jim Turner of Texas as its ranking member. The creation of the committee was necessitated by the creation of the Department of Homeland Security. As an executive branch department, the newly formed Department of Homeland Security required congressional counterparts to facilitate legislative action and oversight.

The committee was made permanent when it was elevated to standing status by a vote of the House of Representatives on January 4, 2005, on the opening day of the 109th Congress, again with Rep. Chris Cox as its first permanent chairman. Rep. Bennie Thompson of Mississippi was the committee's first permanent ranking member. After Chairman Cox resigned from Congress in July 2005 to become the Chairman of the Securities and Exchange Commission, Rep. Peter King of New York served as chairman for the remainder of the 109th Congress.

As Congress switched parties at the beginning of the 110th Congress, Rep. Thompson became the chairman of the committee and Rep. King the ranking member. House control switched parties again at the beginning of the 112th Congress in 2011, and King again became the chairman, and Thompson the ranking member. As the House switched parties at the beginning of the 116th Congress, Thompson again assumed the chair. The committee continues to operate in a bipartisan manner, passing almost all of its legislation out of the committee unanimously.

Hearings

Airport computed tomography (CT) scanners 
In November 2017, the full Homeland Security Committee held a hearing to understand how fast the U.S. government could install CT scanners into every airport in the country in order to fight threats to airlines. The hearing focused on the Transportation Security Administration's (TSA) role in keeping the country secure. The hearing was scheduled because a classified security briefing that was held earlier revealed vulnerabilities to the aviation system that concerned committee members. The latest threats, according to committee Chairman Michael McCaul, "were terrorists using electronic devices and laptops as bombs, and exploding the device on an airplane while the plane is in flight."

DHS Countering Weapons of Mass Destruction (CWMD) Office 
On December 7, 2017, the Subcommittee on Emergency Preparedness, Response, and Communications held a hearing about the creation of a new office within the Department of Homeland Security (DHS) called the Countering Weapons of Mass Destruction (CWMD) Office. “The purpose of the CWMD is to work every day to prevent another catastrophic attack, one using weapons or materials that have the potential to kill our citizens in numbers that dwarf previous attacks,” said James McDonnell, assistant secretary for countering weapons of mass destruction and director of the Domestic Nuclear Detection Office for within DHS. In his remarks, the subcommittee chairman Rep. Dan Donovan (R-NY) said that the threat of weapons of mass destruction "has changed and become more diverse." One witness discussed drone delivery of biological, chemical and nuclear weapons as one of the newest threats to homeland security.

Fiscal year 2018 budget oversight 
In June 2017, Homeland Security Secretary John Kelly testified before the committee regarding DHS's piece of President Trump's Fiscal Year 2018 Budget. During the hearing, members of the committee from both parties "expressed opposition to the Trump administration's proposed budget that would cut funding for training and deployment for local security programs by as much as 30 percent next year [2018]." The overall funding for the department, however, under Trump's budget would increase by almost seven percent. Congressman Peter King (R-NY) said the cuts would affect security programs for New York's first responders, and Congressman Donald Payne (D-NJ) questioned how the cuts would help keep safe the ports of Elizabeth and Newark.

The president's budget for 2018 would:
 Increase the DHS budget for fiscal 2018 by $2.8 billion, to $44.1 billion
 Include funding for 500 new border patrol agents
 Include funding for 1,000 new Immigration and Customs Enforcement agents
 Begin construction of the border wall that Trump promised during his presidential campaign
 Cut grants to local and state agencies by $667 million for pre-disaster mitigation and counterterrorism funding
In November 2017, in an annual oversight hearing called “World Wide Threats: Keeping America Secure in the New Age of Terror”, leaders of the U.S. government's national security agencies “offered troubling assessments of the growing threats from terrorism, both internationally and domestically.”

Members, 118th Congress

Resolutions electing members:  (Chair),  (Ranking Member),  (D),  (R)

Subcommittees for the 118th Congress

Committee Chairs
 Christopher Cox (R-CA), 2002-2005
 Peter King (R-NY), 2005-2007
 Bennie Thompson (D-MS), 2007-2011
 Peter King (R-NY), 2011–2013
 Michael McCaul (R-TX), 2013-2019
 Bennie Thompson (D-MS), 2019–2023
 Mark Green (R-TN), 2023–present

Historical Membership Rosters

115th Congress

116th Congress

Sources:  (chair),  (Ranking Member),  (D),  (R),  (R),  (R),  (R)

Subcommittees

117th Congress

Resolutions electing members:  (chair),  (Ranking Member),  (D),  (R),  (R)
Subcommittees

See also
 List of current United States House of Representatives committees
 Final Report of the Task Force on Combating Terrorist and Foreign Fighter Travel

References

External links
 Committee on Homeland Security homepage (Archive)
 House Homeland Security Committee. Legislation activity and reports, Congress.gov.
 House Homeland Security Committee Hearings and Meetings Video. Congress.gov.
 U.S. Department of Homeland Security homepage
 
 

Homeland Security
Disaster preparedness in the United States
2002 establishments in Washington, D.C.